The Ethics AdviceLine for Journalists is a service that provides free help to professional journalists struggling with an ethical decision while covering the news. The program is supported by the Chicago Headline Club (largest professional chapter of the Society of Professional Journalists), the Chicago Headline Club Foundation, the Howard and Ursula Dubin Foundation and the Medill School of Journalism at Northwestern University.

History
The Ethics AdviceLine for Journalists was started on January 2, 2001 by David Ozar, Casey Bukro and James Burke.  Bukro and Ozar are its co-directors. It has dealt with over 1,000 cases since then.  Queries are responded to by a volunteer staff trained in journalism ethics and teach ethics at universities. Responders include members of the Association for Practical and Professional Ethics.  They are assisted by veteran journalists. AdviceLine also can be contacted through its website.  Staff members are on call for a week at a time.  They review their responses with members of the Chicago Headline Club, the Chicago chapter of the Society of Professional Journalists.  The program aims to help callers think through their situation and decide on a final course of action themselves. In addition to helping journalists, the program also aims to discover in what areas journalists have the most ethical concerns.

Awards and recognition 
In early 2015, AdviceLine won two journalism awards for its blog, which includes commentary on current events in journalism ethics and cases handled by its advisers. On April 23, 2015, the Society of Professional Journalists announced that the AdviceLine blog won the 2014 Sigma Delta Chi Award in the online independent column writing category. The awards recognize exceptional professional journalism. On May 8, 2015, the Chicago Headline Club awarded a 2014 Peter Lisagor Award to the website in the online best continuing independent blog. The Lisagor Awards, named for a celebrated Chicago journalist, are given annually for exemplary journalism. The entry was entitled, "Ethics in Journalism." AdviceLine is partnered with the Chicago Headline Club and the Medill School of Journalism at Northwestern University.

System
The Ethics AdviceLine is a system that allows callers to leave a message at any time.  They may also submit a query online, which is later answered by phone. The program is available only to professional journalists.  The program's official aim is to help callers make ethical decisions that: 
Are well informed by available standards of professional journalistic practice, especially the Society of Professional Journalists Code of Ethics; 
Take account of the perspectives of all the parties involved in the situation; 
Employ clear and careful ethical thinking in reaching a decision

References

American journalism organizations
Ethics organizations
Journalism ethics
Advice organizations